The Twelve Spies, as recorded in the Book of Numbers, were a group of Israelite chieftains, one from each of the Twelve Tribes, who were dispatched by Moses to scout out the Land of Canaan for 40 days as a future home for the Israelite people, during the time when the Israelites were in the wilderness following their Exodus from Ancient Egypt.

God had promised Abraham that there would be a Promised Land for the nations to come out of his son, Isaac. The land of Canaan that the spies were to explore was the same Promised Land. Moses asked for an assessment of the geographic features of the land, the strength and numbers of the population, the agricultural potential and actual performance of the land, civic organization (whether their cities were like camps or strongholds), and forestry conditions. He also asked them to be positive in their outlook and to return with samples of local produce.

When ten of the twelve spies showed little faith in the negative reports they gave about the land, they were slandering what they believed God had promised them. They did not believe that God could help them, and the people as a whole were persuaded that it was not possible to take the land. As a result, the entire nation was made to wander in the desert for 40 years, until almost the entire generation of men had died. Joshua and Caleb were the two spies who brought back a good report and believed that God would help them succeed. They were the only men from their generation permitted to go into the Promised Land after the time of wandering.

About the spies

God had promised the Israelites that they would be able to conquer the land with its indigenous Canaanite nations. Moses instructed the spies to report back on the agriculture and lay of the land. However, during their tour, the spies saw fortified cities and resident giants, which frightened them and led them to believe that the Israelites would not be able to conquer the land as God had promised. Ten of the spies decided to bring back an unbalanced report, emphasizing the difficulty of the task before them.

Two of the spies — Joshua and Caleb — did not go along with the majority and tried to convince the Israelites that they could conquer the land:

However, the Israelite community believed the majority's conclusions. All of the spies, except Joshua and Caleb, were struck down with a plague and died.

Joshua was at first a fierce warrior. He was chosen as the representative from his tribe, Ephraim, to explore the land of Canaan, and was in agreement with Caleb that the Promised Land could be conquered. After the incident with the 12 spies, Joshua lived through the 40 year wandering period, and was named successor to Moses as instructed by God. Joshua completed the task of leading the Israelites into the Promised Land and of taking possession of it. Joshua also was the leader in renewing the Mosaic covenant with their God.

Caleb was from the tribe of Judah. He was also chosen to explore the land of Canaan, and he was (along with Joshua) the other man who said that the God of Israel could help the Israelite people to victory against the Canaanites. God promised Caleb and Joshua that they would receive the land which they had explored for themselves and their descendants. Caleb was also told that he would live to go into the Promised Land.

The names of the twelve spies were:
Shammua, son of Zaccur, from the tribe of Reuben
Shaphat, son of Hori, from the tribe of Simeon
Caleb, son of Jephunneh, from the tribe of Judah
Igal, son of Joseph, from the tribe of Issachar
Hoshea (Joshua), son of Nun, from the tribe of Ephraim
Palti, son of Raphu, from the tribe of Benjamin
Gaddiel, son of Sodi, from the tribe of Zebulun
Gaddi, son of Susi, from the tribe of Manasseh
Ammiel, son of Gemalli, from the tribe of Dan
Sethur, son of Michael, from the tribe of Asher
Nahbi, son of Vophsi, from the tribe of Naphtali
Geuel, son of Maki, from the tribe of Gad

The word "spies" may be an incorrect translation. The Hebrew word that the Torah uses is מרגלים ("meraglim"), which  means "spy". In , the Hebrew word describing the group is also the word usually translated as "men" or the word usually translated as "princes". In addition, the twelve were clearly not trained as spies, nor did they conduct any covert activity, nor is there an account that they enlisted indigenous people for help. Thus, the phrase "Twelve Scouts" or "Twelve Observers" might be an alternative way of describing the group. However, the final point remains that their "report" resulted in a great outcry and the Israelites despaired of entering the promised land and were punished by God accordingly, as outlined above.

Consequences

The Israelites' belief of the false report amounted to the acceptance of lashon hara (lit." "evil tongue" / "slander" in Hebrew) against the Land of Israel.

This was considered a grave sin by God. Corresponding to the 40 days that the spies toured the land, God decreed that the Israelites would wander in the wilderness for 40 years as a result of their unwillingness to take the land. Moreover, the entire generation of men who left Egypt during the Exodus would die in the desert, save for Joshua and Caleb who did not slander the land.

For 40 years, the Israelites wandered in the wilderness, eating quail and manna. They were led into the Promised Land by Joshua; the victory at Jericho marked the beginning of possession of the land. As victories were won, the tracts of land were assigned to each tribe, and they lived peacefully with each other. God brought victories where needed, and his promise to Abraham was fulfilled.

Tisha B'Av

According to Rabbinic tradition (as seen in the Mishnah Taanit 4:6), the sin of the spies produced the annual fast day of Tisha B'Av. When the Israelites accepted the false report, they wept over the false belief that God was setting them up for defeat. The night that the people cried was the ninth of Av, which became a day of weeping and misfortune for all time.

References

Further reading

Book of Numbers people
Tisha B'Av
Spies
Articles about multiple people in the Bible